Ronit Roy is an Indian actor who works in several Indian TV shows and movies. He won the Best Actor in a Negative Role Awards at Star Screen Awards and Zee Cine Awards for his role of an oppressive father in the movie Udaan (2010). He also won the Filmfare Award for Best Supporting Actor for the same.

Roy is one of the most decorated Indian television actors. He has received numerous awards for his performance in shows like Kasautii Zindagii Kay, Kyunki Saas Bhi Kabhi Bahu Thi, Bandini, Adaalat etc.

Apsara Awards

BIG Television Awards

Filmfare Awards

IIFA Awards

Indian Television Academy Awards

Indian Telly Awards

iReel Awards

Kalakar Awards

Screen Awards

Stardust Awards

Zee Cine Awards

Zee Gold Award

Other awards 
 2018: HT India's Most Stylish TV Personality (Male)

References 

Roy, Ronit